Peter Mackie (born 17 January 1958) is a Scottish former footballer noted as a promising prospect at Parkhead.

Career
He began his career at Celtic making 5 appearances in two years. He moved on to Dundee where he established himself of some note fulfilling some that early promise, scoring 19 goals in 151 appearances. Later in his career, he played for St Mirren, where he scored 4 goals in 45 appearances. In 1986, he joined Partick Thistle, scoring three goals in 34 appearances . He finished his time in Scotland, playing once as a trialist with Stranraer.

After his time his Scotland, he began playing in the Canadian Soccer League. In 1987, he joined the National Capital Pioneers (who were renamed as Ottawa Intrepid in 1988), where he spent two seasons. In 1990, he joined Kitchener Spirit (who were renamed Kitchener Kickers in 1991), spending two seasons there as well.

References 

1958 births
Living people
Footballers from Glasgow
Association football midfielders
Scottish footballers
Celtic F.C. players
Dundee F.C. players
St Mirren F.C. players
Partick Thistle F.C. players
Scottish Football League players
Ottawa Intrepid players
Kitchener Spirit players